William Disch (January 12, 1840 – 1912) was a Swiss-born member of the Wisconsin State Assembly.

Biography
Disch was born on January 12, 1840, in Glarus, Switzerland. He later moved to Milwaukee, Wisconsin. During the American Civil War, he served with the 24th Wisconsin Volunteer Infantry Regiment of the Union Army. Disch died in 1912 and was buried at Forest Home Cemetery.

Political career
Disch was elected to the Assembly for Milwaukee County's Third District in 1906 and 1908. Previously, he had been a security guard at the Wisconsin State Capitol. He was a Republican.

References

External links

People from Glarus
Politicians from Milwaukee
Republican Party members of the Wisconsin State Assembly
People of Wisconsin in the American Civil War
Union Army soldiers
Security guards
1840 births
1912 deaths
Burials in Wisconsin
19th-century American politicians
Swiss emigrants to the United States